Burke Trieschmann is an American composer and sound designer who provides music for film and video games. He worked for the original Crystal Dynamics team, scoring the music for games such as Total Eclipse, The Horde, Pandemonium! and 102 Dalmatians: Puppies to the Rescue. His soundtrack for The Horde won an award for Best Musical Score from Computer Gaming World in 1994.

References

External links
 

20th-century American composers
20th-century American male musicians
21st-century American composers
21st-century American male musicians
American male composers
Living people
American sound designers
Video game composers
Year of birth missing (living people)